The Union of Liberian Democrats (ULD) is a political party in Liberia. It fielded candidates in the 11 October 2005 elections.

Robert Kpoto, presidential candidate of the ULD, won 0.4% of the vote. The party failed to win any seats in the Senate or House of Representatives. The Union of Liberian Democrats (ULD) is a political party in Liberia. It fielded candidates in the 11 October 2005 elections.

Robert Kpoto, presidential candidate of the ULD, won 0.4% of the vote. The party failed to win any seats in the Senate or House of Representatives.

The 2011 Liberian general election was held on 11 October 2011 which MASON, Jonathan A. ran under the ticket of The Union of Liberian Democrats (ULD) but failed to win the presidential seat.

MASON, Jonathan A.  got  2,645 votes which is 	0.2%. The party failed to win any seats in the Senate or House of Representatives in the 2011 general elections.

References

Political parties in Liberia